Masters of Doom: How Two Guys Created an Empire and Transformed Pop Culture is a 2003 book by David Kushner about video game company id Software and its influence on popular culture, focusing on co-founders John Carmack and John Romero.

Upon release, Masters of Doom received positive reviews from critics and has been placed on numerous "best of" lists for video game books. The book would later influence Palmer Luckey to establish the technology company Oculus VR, and Alexis Ohanian and Steve Huffman to found reddit. In 2019, it was announced that the USA Network had greenlit a pilot episode of a potential series based on the book.

Background
David Kushner was a contributor for news outlets such as The New York Times, Rolling Stone, and Wired. Because this is his first book, he spent five years on research. He moved to Dallas, Texas to conduct the interviews with the subjects, interviewing them late into the night.

Content

The book describes the respective childhoods of the "two Johns", their first meeting at Softdisk in 1989 and the eventual founding of their own company, id Software. It discusses in detail the company's first successes, the popular and groundbreaking Commander Keen and Wolfenstein 3D games, and the new heights the company reached with Doom, which granted the company unprecedented success, fame, and notoriety. It discusses id's next project, Quake, the aftermath of Romero's departure from the company, and his founding and the eventual collapse of Ion Storm, his new game development studio. Kushner describes the new gamer culture created by Doom and its impact on society.

The games are discussed in detail, and Kushner's main focus is in the work dynamic and personalities that enabled their creation. He describes Carmack and Romero as the driving forces of id Software, but with very different personalities. Romero is presented as having unbridled creativity and considerable skill, but he loses focus when the spectacular success of the games allows him to adopt a rock star-like public persona. Carmack is depicted as an introvert, whose unparalleled programming skills are the core of id Software, enabling the company to create extremely sophisticated games. However, he has little interest in – or even understanding of – the social niceties that enable people to enjoy working together.

Much of the book concentrates on this dynamic. The two initially complement each other well, but eventually conflicts develop, leading Romero to be fired. Carmack, the skilled creator of the complicated and fast game engines the company's products use, is repeatedly referred to as the only person in the company who is not expendable, and this gives him a great degree of authority and influence. However, this influence transforms id Software into a considerably less pleasant and fun place to work and causes its games to become increasingly repetitive, though technologically sophisticated. Romero is on the opposite end of the spectrum; his Ion Storm is intended to be a very fun place to work, where "[game] design is law" (Ion Storm's slogan was "Design is Law") and that technology must be created to realize the designer's vision, instead of the other way around. However, his lack of management and organizational focus leads to poor and financially disastrous results.

Although Kushner adopts a novel-like narrative, Masters of Doom is a work of journalism. According to his notes in the book, it is based on hundreds of interviews conducted over a six-year period. Kushner was an early entrant into the field of video game journalism, and recycled some of his own original reporting in the book.

Publication
Masters of Doom: How Two Guys Created an Empire and Transformed Pop Culture was first published in May 2003 by Random House in hardcover and ebook form. Random House released an excerpt of the book before its release. Random House later negotiated a deal with UK publisher Piatkus, releasing a trade paperback in autumn 2003.

Reception

Seth Mnookin for The New York Times described the book for its pacing and detail, calling it "an impressive and adroit social history". Jeff Jensen for Entertainment Weekly gave it a "B" rating. Thomas L. McDonald for Maximum PC praised its prose and its representation of the subjects. Edge described the book as being akin to a Greek drama without the pathos, adding that the story was "a cautionary tale of relationships in the games industry". Hardcore Gaming 101 considered the book "a highly entertaining and quite informative read". Scott Juster for PopMatters praised Kushner's extensive research and interviews of Carmack and Romero. Since its release, the book has been on several "best video game books" lists.

Salon contributor Wagner James Au, while declaring the book to be "excellent", criticized David Kushner for giving too much credit to the technical merit of Catacomb 3-D in comparison to Ultima Underworld. Ann Donahue for Variety considered the character study of "the two Johns" to be interesting but thought the book had "problematic tunnel vision" by rarely taking a broader look at the impact Doom had outside of the gaming industry. Computer Gaming Worlds Charles Ardai called it "clumsily written but nonetheless compelling". Publishers Weekly considered Kushner to have given too much leeway about the violence in the games, and criticized the narration as dry in parts of the book.

Legacy
Palmer Luckey, the founder of the technology company Oculus VR, first became interested in virtual reality after reading Masters of Doom. John Carmack later left id Software in 2013 to join Oculus as chief technology officer. In a 2013 blog post, Alexis Ohanian revealed that the book inspired Ohanian and Steve Huffman to found reddit. In 2016, Kushner released an audiobook follow-up titled Prepare to Meet Thy Doom and More True Gaming Stories. The book is a compilation of Kushner's long-form journalism which includes a "where-they-are-now" article on Carmack and Romero. The book was read by Wil Wheaton.

Lawsuit
In 2005, former Ion Storm chief executive officer Michael Wilson sued publisher Random House Inc., claiming the book made false allegations against him making a questionable business deal to purchase a BMW with funds from the company. Wilson sought $50 million in damages, with further punitive damages from the publisher. A spokesperson for Random House issued a statement announcing the publishing company's support of David Kushner. As of 2020, the outcome of the lawsuit is unknown.

Adaptation
A movie adaptation was first conceived in 2005, when it was announced that producer Naren Shankar was planning a television movie for Showtime based on the story. The movie never materialized beyond the initial announcement.

In June 2019, USA Network greenlit a pilot episode of a potential series based on the book, to be written and produced by Tom Bissell under James and Dave Franco's Ramona Films label. The series, if it should continue, is expected to be an anthology series. The series would feature Eduardo Franco as Romero, Patrick Gibson as Carmack, and star John Karna, Jane Ackermann, Siobhan Williams, and Peter Friedman, directed by Rhys Thomas.

See also
 List of books about video games

Notes

References
 This article uses content from the GFDL Doom Wiki article "Masters of Doom"

Further reading

External links
 
 Audiobooks.com's Masters of Doom Release Page
 Author David Kushner's Website
 Masters of Doom GameSpy Coverage

2003 non-fiction books
Books about video games
Doom (franchise)
Random House books